The Moskalyev SAM-5 was a 1930s Soviet transport or air ambulance monoplane designed by Aleksandr Moskalyev. The type served in small numbers in the Second World War as an air ambulance.

Development and design
The SAM-5 was a cantilever high-wing monoplane with fixed conventional landing gear and an enclosed cabin for a pilot and four passengers. The first prototype was built using stressed-skin light alloy construction but it had problems with the quality of workmanship in what was an unfamiliar material. The second-prototype SAM-5bis was built using plywood and fabric and had wing bracing and a more slender fuselage. After testing 37 production aircraft were built and they were delivered from 1937 as air ambulances with room for three patients and an attendant.

Moskalyev then worked on an improved variant, the SAM-5-2bis, tested with a 200 hp (149 kW) engine; the aircraft established distance and height records. An order was placed for 200 of the improved variant, again for use as an air ambulance but they were never built. This last SAM-5 variant led to four, differently numbered, developments.

SAM-5-2bis developments
SAM-10 Low wing,  inline, 5/6 seater.
SAM-11 High wing,  inline, 4 seat amphibian.
SAM-14 High wing,  inline, 6 seat version.
SAM-25 High wing,  radial, military assault/ transport.

Specifications (SAM-5bis)

See also

References

Notes

Bibliography

1930s Soviet civil utility aircraft
High-wing aircraft
Moskalyev aircraft